Tristan Eaton (1978) is an American artist. Primarily known for his toy designs and street art murals, Eaton is also a graphic designer and illustrator.

Early life
Eaton was born in Hollywood, California, in 1978. He moved to New York City at 20 years of age and attended the New York School of Visual Arts, He returned to live in Los Angeles 15 years later.

Career

Graphic and toy design
Eaton co-designed the Dunny Toy in 2004 when he was 26. Shortly after Eaton collaborated with the toy designer Paul Budnitz to produce "Kid Robot."

In 2006, Eaton collaborated with Burger King to create a vinyl designer toy, “Subservient Chicken”

Eaton created posters for Barack Obama's 2008 presidential election campaign.

In 2009, Eaton was the designer of Soul Train Music Awards for BET, a subsidiary of Viacom.

In 2020 he designed the tickets and game program for the Superbowl.

Public murals
In 2013, Eaton created the mural Audrey of Mulberry in Little Italy, Manhattan.

Eaton's 2014 public mural I was a Botox Junkie is located at the corner of Traction and East Third streets in Los Angeles.

In 2014 Eaton painted a six-story public mural of Alexander Graham Bell, titles the Spirit of Communiction, in West Palm Beach, Florida. On March 3, 2016, part of the wall that the mural was painted on collapsed. The entire wall and mural was demolished the same year.

In 2015 Eaton executed a commissioned mural for the Long Beach Art Museum as part of the exhibition Vitality and Verve: Transforming the Urban Landscape.

In 2019 he sued an Ottawa, Canada real estate developer for using his work in the promotional material for a student residence. The same year, he executed a large-scale commissioned public mural large scale mural on the 236 Fifth Avenue building in Manhattan, New York City.

Eaton's 2019 mural of a monster was commissioned by and installed at Universal Studios, Los Angeles.

Collections
Eaton’s work is included in the permanent collection of the Museum of Modern Art in New York City.

References

External Links
 PBS News Hour Weekend:  Street artist and designer Tristan Eaton’s global canvas reported: Jun 12, 2021

1978 births
Living people
American graffiti artists
People from Hollywood, Los Angeles
Street artists
Toy designers